DWBR (1584 AM) is a Baháʼí radio station owned by Dawnbreakers Foundation. The station's studio and transmitter are located at #271 Zone 1, Brgy. Bulac, Talavera, Nueva Ecija.

References

Radio stations established in 2002
Radio stations in Nueva Ecija